Friedrich Leopold Sell (born 26 May 1954) is a professor of Economics at Bundeswehr University Munich as well as chief of the scientific council of Halle Institute for Economic Research. Furthermore, he is vice chief of studies at the Academy for Business and Administration in Munich.

Life 

Sell studied from 1974 to 1979 Economics at the University of Freiburg and started to work there as a scientist 1979. He received his doctorate in 1981 and his Habilitation in 1988. After temporarily working as a visiting professor for economics and research on development countries Sell from 1991 to 1992 was full professor of economics at University of Gießen.

In 1992 he switched to the Dresden University of Technology, where he was offered a chair of economics, especially international economic relations. Since 1998 Sell is full professor of economics, especially macroeconomics and economic policy, at the Bundeswehr University of Munich. From 2008 to 2010 he was the university's vice president, responsible for research. Since 2010 he is chief of the scientific council of Halle Institute for Economic Research where he already had a position before.

Sell focuses his research on international economic relations and theoretical as well as political questions of the macroeconomic theory.

Publications
 Sell, Friedrich (2001). Contagion in Financial Markets. Edgar Elgar: Northhamton.
 Aktuelle Probleme der europäischen Wirtschaftspolitik (UTB Taschenbuch; 2307). 2nd ed.. Lucius & Lucius Verlag, Stuttgart 2007, 
 Aufgaben und Lösungen in der Volkswirtschaftslehre. Springer, Berlin 2007, 
 Einführung in die Volkswirtschaftslehre. 4th ed. Springer, Berlin 2007,  (in collaboration with Paul Engelkamp)
 Globalisierung und nationale Entwicklungspolitik. Lit-Verlag, Münster 2003,  (in collaboration with Uwe Mummert)
 Emotionen, Markt und Moral (Kulturelle Ökonomik; Vol. 7). Lit-Verlag, Münster 2005,  (in collaboration with Uwe Mummert)

Literature 
 Dorit Petschel (Bearb.): Die Professoren der TU Dresden 1828–2003. Böhlau Verlag, Köln / Weimar / Vienna 2003, S. 906.

References

External links
 Institute of Prof. Dr. Friedrich L. Sell

1954 births
Living people
German economists
Economics educators
University of Freiburg alumni
Academic staff of Bundeswehr University Munich
German male non-fiction writers